WikiNodes is an app for the Apple iPad built by IDEA.org.  WikiNodes was the first tablet app for browsing Wikipedia using a radial tree  approach to visualize how articles and subsections of articles are interrelated. The app displays  related items (articles or sections of an article), which spread on the screen, as a spiderweb of icons.

Operation 

The app uses the SpicyNodes visualization technique which was awarded a "best for teaching and learning" award in 2011 from American Association of School Librarians (AASL), and voted #edchat's 35 Best Web 2.0 Classroom Tools in 2010.

The user interface is based on two display modes:
 Page view –  displays Wikipedia articles in long form, similar to how they appear on the main Wikipedia web site.
 Node view – divides Wikipedia articles into sections, and links articles to related articles, similar to mind mapping. The user can drag nodes, taps any node to display it in detail, with a panel to scroll to read the contents of the section. This provides a visual way to see the relationships between articles.
As of June 2011, the app supports the 36 top Wikipedia languages (by number of articles).

Reception 

The app was highlighted as a "Staff pick" by Apple's U.S. App Store, Week of May 28, 2011; as "New and Noteworthy" by Apple's U.S. App Store, Week of May 5, 2011; and at other times by Apple's app stores for non-US countries. It has been favorably covered by several bloggers, including those in the references below.

See also
 List of Wikipedia mobile applications –  Other iOS mobile apps providing access to Wikipedia
 Radial tree –  the general type of layout algorithm
 SpicyNodes – Information visualization technique

References

External links
 Direct link to listing in Apple app store

Graph drawing software
IOS software
Wikipedia
Computer-related introductions in 2010